Det Nye Teater was a theatre that opened in Oslo in 1929, and ended as an independent theatre in 1959, when it merged with Folketeatret to form Oslo Nye Teater. The theatre's original purpose was to support contemporary Norwegian drama.

History
The company A/S Det Nye Teater was founded in 1918, by Johan Bojer and Peter Egge. Among the largest financial supporters were ship owner Ivar An Christensen, and also the Norwegian State bought a significant number of shares. The theatre building was designed by the architects Blakstad and Dunker. The theatre's first artistic director was Ingolf Schanche, from 1928 to 1931. The theatre opened on 26 to 28 February 1929, with Knut Hamsun's trilogy, Ved rigets port, Livets spil and Aftenrøde, followed by Peter Egge's play Kjærlighet og venskap. From 1931 to 1932 Thomas Thomassen managed the theatre, and from 1932 to 1933 Gyda Christensen. Einar Sissener was theatre director from 1933 to 1934, and Hjalmar Friis and Gyda Christensen jointly from 1934 to 1935. Sissener and Fridtjof Mjøen were managers until 1937, when Victor Bernau took over until 1939. From 1939 the theatre was managed by Gyda Christensen, and Tore Foss from 1945 to 1947. Axel Otto Normann managed the theatre from 1947 to 1959. He was also the first director at Oslo Nye Teater after the merge between Folketeatret and Det Nye Teater in 1959.

Among actors who performed at Det Nye Teater were Hauk Aabel, Gunnar Tolnæs, Harald Stormoen, Knut Hergel, Agnes Mowinckel, Alfred Maurstad, Harald Steen, Tore Segelcke, Georg Løkkeberg, Wenche Foss, Jens Gunderssen, Sonja Wigert, Lillebil Ibsen, Henki Kolstad, Merete Skavlan, Knut Thomassen, Arne Thomas Olsen, Mona Hofland, Johannes Eckhoff and Per Sunderland.

References 

Former theatres in Norway
1929 establishments in Norway
1959 disestablishments in Norway
Theatres in Oslo